Epicaecilius is a genus of Psocoptera from the Caeciliusidae family.

References 

Caeciliusidae
Insects described in 2000